In mathematics, Novikov's compact leaf theorem, named after Sergei Novikov, states that

 A codimension-one foliation of a compact 3-manifold whose universal covering space is not contractible must have a compact leaf.

Novikov's compact leaf theorem for S3 
Theorem: A smooth codimension-one foliation of the 3-sphere S3 has a compact leaf. The leaf is a torus T2 bounding a solid torus with the Reeb foliation.

The theorem was proved by Sergei Novikov in 1964. Earlier Charles Ehresmann had conjectured that every smooth codimension-one foliation on S3 had a compact leaf, which was known to be true for all known examples; in particular, the Reeb foliation has a compact leaf that is T2.

Novikov's compact leaf theorem for any M3 
In 1965, Novikov proved the compact leaf theorem for any M3:

Theorem: Let M3 be a closed 3-manifold with a smooth codimension-one foliation F.  Suppose any of the following conditions is satisfied:

 the fundamental group  is finite,
 the second homotopy group ,
 there exists a leaf  such that the map  induced by inclusion has a non-trivial kernel.

Then F has a compact leaf of genus g ≤ 1.

In terms of covering spaces:

A codimension-one foliation of a compact 3-manifold whose universal covering space is not contractible must have a compact leaf.

References
 S. Novikov. The topology of foliations//Trudy Moskov. Mat. Obshch, 1965, v. 14, p. 248–278.
 I. Tamura. Topology of foliations — AMS, v.97, 2006.
 D. Sullivan, Cycles for the dynamical study of foliated manifolds and complex manifolds, Invent. Math., 36 (1976), p. 225–255. 

Foliations
Theorems in topology